Shiratayama Hidetoshi (born 25 December 1943 as Hidetoshi Shirata) is a former sumo wrestler from Kagami, Kumamoto, Japan. He made his professional debut in September July 1959 and reached the top division in March 1971. His highest rank was maegashira 4. Upon retirement from active competition he became an elder in the Japan Sumo Association, under the name  Tanigawa. He reached the Sumo Association's mandatory retirement age in December 2008.

Career record

See also
Glossary of sumo terms
List of past sumo wrestlers
List of sumo tournament second division champions

References

1943 births
Living people
Japanese sumo wrestlers
Sumo people from Kumamoto Prefecture